Menzies Creek is a township in Victoria, Australia, 40 km east of Melbourne's Central Business District, located within the Shires of Cardinia and Yarra Ranges local government areas. Menzies Creek recorded a population of 966 at the 2021 census.

Menzies' Creek Post Office opened on 2 May 1887 and closed in 1980.

Menzies Creek railway station opened on 18 December 1900 with the opening of the Gembrook line. The station name was changed to Aura on 5 December 1904—while the Post Office remained Menzies Creek—but reverted to Menzies Creek on 4 July 1947.

The area is named after James Menzies, a gold digger in the 1860s, who worked the area for many years and is believed to be buried locally.

Schools
Menzies Creek Primary School is a small school with a distinctive community focus.

Reserves
Menzies Creek Reserve, with two soccer pitches in winter (Monbulk Rangers Soccer Club) and a cricket oval in summer.

See also
 Shire of Sherbrooke – Menzies Creek was previously within this former local government area.
 Menzies Creek railway station

References

Yarra Ranges
Shire of Cardinia